Tigerville is an unincorporated community and census-designated place in Greenville County, South Carolina, United States. As of the 2010 United States Census the population was 1,312. North Greenville University, a private institution of higher education affiliated with the Southern Baptist Convention, and whose baseball team won the national NCAA Division II baseball tournament in 2022, is located in Tigerville. The community is part of the Greenville–Mauldin–Easley Metropolitan Statistical Area.

Poinsett Bridge was listed on the National Register of Historic Places in 1970.

Demographics

2020 census

As of the 2020 United States census, there were 1,244 people, 27 households, and 19 families residing in the CDP.

References

External links
North Greenville University

Census-designated places in Greenville County, South Carolina
Census-designated places in South Carolina
Upstate South Carolina